Harburg-Wilhelmsburg was a city in the Prussian Province of Hanover briefly in existence from 1927 and 1937, resulting from the merger of the cities of Harburg and Wilhelmsburg. In 1937, Harburg-Wilhelmsburg, along with the cities from the Prussian Province of Schleswig-Holstein, Altona and Wandsbek, is annexed to Hamburg in the Greater Hamburg Act. Despite its incorporation into Hamburg, Harburg continued to be the district capital of the Hanoverian district of Harburg. In 1944, the district capital was transferred to Winsen (Luhe).

Today, the former city takes up the major part of the borough of Harburg.

20th century in Hamburg